The kamiza is the "top seat" within a room, meaning the seat of honor; the term also applies to the best seats in air-planes, trains, and cars. The antonym, meaning "bottom seat," is shimoza (下座). In a room, the kamiza is the seat or position that is most comfortable, usually furthest from the door – because this is warmest, and was safest from attack back in the feudal period. In a traditional washitsu room it would often be a zabuton placed so the person sitting there has his back to the tokonoma; the kamiza is the spot closest to the tokonoma or simply farthest from the door in a room lacking a tokonoma. In a  Western-style room it would be a comfortable armchair or sofa, or the head of a table. 
The term is general, and does not only apply to Japanese culture.

Choosing a seat
When entering a room in Japan on a formal occasion, participants are expected to assume the correct seating position, and to leave the kamiza free for the most important person present, either a guest of honor or the person of highest rank. However, if one humbly sits somewhere indicative of lower status and is then encouraged by the host to move to the kamiza, it is acceptable to do so.

The best seats in a car in descending order of rank are: directly behind the driver, behind the front passenger, in the middle of the back seat, front  passenger seat, driver. In  air-plane or train passenger seating, the "top seat" is the window-side, followed by the aisle seat and then the middle seat.

See also
 Butsudan
 Etiquette in Japan
 Kamidana
 Tokonoma

References

Etiquette
Japanese home
Japanese culture
Japanese words and phrases
Japanese martial arts terminology